Robert Brower (July 14, 1850 – December 1934) was an actor who appeared in many American films. He appeared in several Edison films. He was lauded for his "characterizations" including in Apples of Sodom.

Brower was born in Point Pleasant, New Jersey. While in his teens he performed in theater.

Filmography

Aida (1911) as High Priest of Isis 
Silver Threads Among the Gold (1911)
Hearts and Diamonds (1912)
The Shadow on the Blind (1912)
Helping John (1912)
The Ambassador's Daughter (1913)
Apples of Sodom (1913)
Dolly Varden (1913)
The Diamond Crown (1913)  as Inspector Dalton 
The Substitute Stenographer (1913) as the Police Inspector 
The Mystery of the Fadeless Tints (1914) as Detective Narko
The Myster of the Glass Tubes (1914) as Detective Narko
The Vanishing Cracksman (1914) as Detective Narko
Vanity Fair (1915) as Mr. Osborne 
When Love Is King (1916) as The Prime Minister
Builders of Castles (1917) as The Builder
The Tell-Tale Step (1917) as Doctor Oppenheim Bertellini
The Mystery of the Double Cross (1917) as Herbert Brewster
Something to Do (1919) as Mr. Remwick
The Beauty Market (1919) as Amelia's Uncle Issacs
Rose o' the River (1919) as Grandfather Wiley
Hawthorne of the U.S.A. (1919) as De Witz 
Everywoman (1919) as Age
The Heart of Youth (1919) as The Squire 
Held by the Enemy (1920) as Uncle Rufus 
A Cumberland Romance (1920) as Mountain Bishop
Jack Straw (1920) as Count of Pomerania 
A City Sparrow (1920) as Parson Neil 
Peck's Bad Boy (1921) as The Minister (uncredited) 
The Little Minister (1921) as Hendry Munn
The Jucklins (1921) as Attorney Conkwright 
What Every Woman Knows (1921) as Scot Lawyer
The Lost Romance (1921) as Butler
The Faith Healer (1921) as Dr. Martin 
Is Matrimony a Failure? (1922) as Marriage License Clerk
The Man Who Saw Tomorrow (1922) as Bishop 
Thirty Days (1922) as Professor Huxley 
Singed Wings (1922) as Don José della Guerda
Fools First (1922) as Butler 
Racing Hearts (1923) as Horatio Whipple 
Adam's Rib (1923) as Hugo Kermaier 
Long Live the King (1923) as The King
Fifth Avenue Models (1924) as Art Salesman 
 Riders Up (1924) as General Jeff
The Thoroughbred (1925)
The Honeymoon Express (1926) as Dick Donaldson 
Wild Oats Lane (1926) as The Kleptomaniac
The Gay Defender (1927) as Ferdinand Murrieta
The Last Trail (1927) as Sam Beasley
Beggars of Life (1928) as Blind Sims (uncredited)
Abraham Lincoln (1930) (uncredited)
Blind Adventure (1933) as Hotel Dining Guest (uncredited)
The Invisible Man (1933) as Farmer (uncredited)

References

1850 births
1934 deaths
American male film actors
Male actors from New Jersey
People from Point Pleasant, New Jersey